DTL is diode–transistor logic, a class of digital circuits.

DTL may also refer to:

 Downtown MRT line, a Singapore mass transit line
 Down-The-Line, a variation of the shooting sport trap shooting
 DTL (gene), a gene in the human genome
 Django Template Language, the default template system for the Django web framework
 Drawn to Life, a video game for the Nintendo DS
 Dutch Type Library, a Dutch typeface design company

See also
 Datagram Transport Layer Security